The 2010 Eurocup Formula Renault 2.0 season was the 20th Eurocup Formula Renault 2.0 season. It began on 17 April at Motorland Aragon and ended on 10 October at Circuit de Catalunya after eight rounds and sixteen races.

The series had a new look for 2010, with the introduction of the Barazi-Epsilon chassis to replace the original Tatuus chassis which had been the mainstay of Formula Renault 2.0 during the 2000s. Both season-opening races at Motorland Aragón were won by Eurocup debutant Kevin Korjus, who had moved up from the Formula Renault 2.0 Northern European Cup over the off-season. It was not until the final race before the runner-up placing was decided. Tech 1 Racing's Arthur Pic held a five-point advantage over Interwetten Junior Team driver Luciano Bacheta before the final race, but was decided in Bacheta's favour after Pic was disqualified for failing to observe a drive-through penalty for short-cutting a chicane while attempting to pass team-mate Carlos Sainz Jr. who was competing as a guest. The trio claimed 14 of the 16 race wins on offer, with the other wins going to fifth-placed Giovanni Venturini and Javier Tarancón, both driving for Epsilon Euskadi.

Teams and drivers
 Guest entries are listed in italics.

Race calendar
 The series was a part of the World Series by Renault, supporting the Formula Renault 3.5 Series at all races except Monaco. An FIA press release confirmed all races except the rounds at Motorland Aragón and Magny-Cours.

Championship standings
 Points for both championships are awarded as follows:

Drivers' Championship

Teams' Championship

References

External links

 Official website of the Eurocup Formula Renault 2.0 championship

Eurocup
Eurocup Formula Renault
Eurocup Formula Renault
Renault Eurocup